Parvicirce is a genus of saltwater clams, marine bivalve molluscs in the family Veneridae, the venus clams.

Species
 Parvicirce donacina Cosel, 1995

References

External links
 
 Cosel R. von 1995. Fifty-one new species of marine bivalves from tropical West Africa. Iberus, 13(1): 1-115

Veneridae
Bivalve genera